Cyclone of the Range is a 1927 American silent Western film directed by Robert De Lacey and starring Tom Tyler, Elsie Tarron, and Frankie Darro.

Cast
 Tom Tyler as Tom MacKay 
 Elsie Tarron as Mollie Butler 
 Harry O'Connor as Seth Butler 
 Richard Howard as Jake Dakin 
 Frankie Darro as Frankie Butler 
 Harry Woods as The Black Rider / Don Alvarado

References

External links
 

1927 films
1927 Western (genre) films
Films directed by Robert De Lacey
American black-and-white films
Film Booking Offices of America films
Silent American Western (genre) films
1920s English-language films
1920s American films